Atholi is a Grama Panchayath in Kozhikode district of Kerala state, South India. It is a small town on the banks of Korapuzha river. State highway to Kuttiyadi passes through Atholi and it is connected to National Highway 17 through Kuniyil Kadavu bridge which is the longest in Kozhikode district.

Economy 

Traditionally Agriculture and Fishing were the economic activities of people. The coir making industry also played a vital role. Atholi was an ideal place for coir industry because of its coconut plantations and the boating route through the Korapuzha river to other parts of Malabar. Coir products like rope and carpets from Atholi were famous throughout Malabar region. During the late-1970s men from Atholi started moving to Middle East (especially Saudi Arabia, Bahrain, UAE, and Kuwait) in search of better job opportunities which even continues today. Now the remittance from abroad by these employees is the back bone of the economy.

Suburbs of Kozhikode
Villages in Kozhikode district